Hamiltons Fort is an unincorporated community in south-central Iron County, Utah, United States.

Description
A post office called Hamiltons Fort was in operation between 1859 and 1913.  Variant names were "Hamilton Fort", "Fort Hamilton", "Fort Hamblin", "Hamblin", "Hambleton", and "Hamilton". The community was named after John Hamilton, a pioneer settler.

See also

References

External links

Unincorporated communities in Utah
Unincorporated communities in Iron County, Utah